Lux Radio Theatre was an American radio show that ran on the NBC Blue Network (1934–35), the CBS Radio network (Columbia Broadcasting System) (1935–54), and NBC Radio (1954–55). Every week they broadcast an hour-long adaptation of a popular film or Broadway play, often starring members of the original cast.

NOTE: First broadcast dates are currently listed in year-month-day (YYYY-MM-DD) format.

Episodes: 1934–1939

1934

1935 
{| class="wikitable sortable plainrowheaders" width=90%
|+ 1935
|-
! width=5% scope="col" | First broadcast
! width=25% scope="col" | Title
! width=25% scope="col" | Starring
! width=25% scope="col" | Notes
|-
| rowspan=|1935-01-06
| scope="row"| The Green Goddess
| 
|
|-
| rowspan=|1935-01-13
| scope="row"| Counsellor at Law
| 
|
|-
| rowspan=|1935-01-20
| scope="row"| The Late Christopher Bean
| 
| Filmed in 1933 as Christopher Bean
|-
| rowspan=|1935-01-27
| scope="row"| The Bad Man
| 
|
|-
| rowspan=|1935-02-03
| scope="row"| Peg o' My Heart
| 
|
|-
| rowspan=|1935-02-10
| scope="row"| The First Year
| 
|
|-
| rowspan=|1935-02-17
| scope="row"| The Old Soak
| 
|
|-
| rowspan=|1935-02-24
| scope="row"| Nothing But the Truth
| 
|
|-
| rowspan=|1935-03-03
| scope="row"| Lilac Time
| 
|
|-
| rowspan=|1935-03-10
| scope="row"| Holiday
| 
|
|-
| rowspan=|1935-03-17
| scope="row"| Her Master's Voice
| 
|
|-
| rowspan=|1935-03-24
| scope="row"| Secrets
| 
|
|-
| rowspan=|1935-03-31
| scope="row"| The Romantic Age
| 
|
|-
| rowspan=|1935-04-07
| scope="row"| The Prince Chap
| 
|
|-
| rowspan=|1935-04-14
| scope="row"| The Broken Wing
| 
|
|-
| rowspan=|1935-04-21
| scope="row"| Little Women
| 
|
|-
| rowspan=|1935-04-28
| scope="row"| Ada Beats the Drum
| 
|
|-
| rowspan=|1935-05-05
| scope="row"| Adam and Eva
| 
|
|-
| rowspan=|1935-05-12
| scope="row"| The Bishop Misbehaves
| 
|
|-
| rowspan=|1935-05-19
| scope="row"| The Lion and the Mouse
| 
|
|-
| rowspan=|1935-05-26
| scope="row"| Michael and Mary
| 
|
|-
| rowspan=|1935-06-02
| scope="row"| The Vinegar Tree
| 
|
|-
| rowspan=|1935-06-09
| scope="row"| Candle Light
| 
|
|-
| rowspan=|1935-06-16
| scope="row"| The Patsy
| 
|
|-
| rowspan=|1935-06-23
| scope="row"| Polly With a Past
| 
|
|-
| rowspan=|1935-06-30
| scope="row"| Elmer, the Great
| 
|
|-
| rowspan=|1935-07-29
| scope="row"| Bunty Pulls the Strings
| 
|
|-
| rowspan=|1935-08-05
| scope="row"| [[Lightnin' (play)|Lightnin''']]
| 
|
|-
| rowspan=|1935-08-12
| scope="row"| The Man in Possession| 
|
|-
| rowspan=|1935-08-19
| scope="row"| Ladies of the Jury| 
|
|-
| rowspan=|1935-08-26
| scope="row"| The Church Mouse| 
|
|-
| rowspan=|1935-09-02
| scope="row"| Whistling in the Dark| 
|
|-
| rowspan=|1935-09-09
| scope="row"| Petticoat Influence| 
|
|-
| rowspan=|1935-09-16
| scope="row"| Leah Kleschna| 
|
|-
| rowspan=|1935-09-23
| scope="row"| Mary, Mary, Quite Contrary| 
|
|-
| rowspan=|1935-09-30
| scope="row"| Alias Jimmy Valentine 
| 
|
|-
| rowspan=|1935-10-07
| scope="row"| The Wren| 
|
|-
| rowspan=|1935-10-14
| scope="row"| Within the Law| 
|
|-
| rowspan=|1935-10-21
| scope="row"| Merely Mary Ann| 
|
|-
| rowspan=|1935-10-28
| scope="row"| Dulcy| 
|
|-
| rowspan=|1935-11-04
| scope="row"| The Milky Way| 
|
|-
| rowspan=|1935-11-11
| scope="row"| His Misleading Lady| 
|
|-
| rowspan=|1935-11-18
| scope="row"| Sherlock Holmes| 
|
|-
| rowspan=|1935-11-25
| scope="row"| Way Down East| 
|
|-
| rowspan=|1935-12-02
| scope="row"| The Swan| 
|
|-
| rowspan=|1935-12-09
| scope="row"| The Show-Off| 
|
|-
| rowspan=|1935-12-16
| scope="row"| The Truth| 
|
|-
| rowspan=|1935-12-23
| scope="row"| Applesauce| 
|
|-
| rowspan=|1935-12-30
| scope="row"| The Queen's Husband| 
|
|}

 1936 

 1937 

 1938 

 1939 

 Episodes: 1940–1949 

 1940 

 1941 

 1942 

 1943 

 1944 

 1945 

 1946 

 1947 

 1948 

 1949 

 Episodes: 1950–1955 

 1950 

 1951 

 1952 

 1953 

 1954 

 1955 

 See also 
 Lux Video Theatre''

References

External links 

1930s American radio programs